The Women's RS:X was a sailing event on the Sailing at the 2008 Summer Olympics program in Qingdao International Sailing Centre. Eleven races (last one a medal race) were scheduled and completed. 27 sailors, on 27 boards, from 27 nations competed. Ten boards qualified for the medal race.

Race schedule

Course areas and course configurations 
For the RS:X course areas A  (Yellow) and B  (Red) were used. The location (36°1'26"’N, 120°26'52"E) points to the center of the 0.6nm radius Yellow course area and the location (36°2'21"N, 120°25'32"E) points to the center of the 0.6nm radius Red course area. The target time for the course was about 30–35 minutes for the races and 20 minutes for the medal race. The race management could choose from several course configurations.

Outer courses 
 O1: START – 1 – 2 – 3s/3p – 2 – 3p – FINISH
 O2: START – 1 – 2 – 3s/3p – 2 – 3s/3p – 2 – 3p – FINISH
 O3: START – 1 – 2 – 3s/3p – 2 – 3s/3p – 2 – 3s/3p – 2 – 3p – FINISH

Inner courses 
 I1: START – 1 – 4s/4p – 1 – 2 – 3p – FINISH
 I2: START – 1 – 4s/4p – 1 – 4s/4p – 1 – 2 – 3p – FINISH
 I3: START – 1 – 4s/4p – 1 – 4s/4p – 1 – 4s/4p – 1 – 2 – 3p – FINISH

Windward-Leeward courses 
 W2: START – 1 – 4s/4p – 1 – FINISH
 W3: START – 1 – 4s/4p – 1 – 4s/4p – 1 – FINISH
 W4: START – 1 – 4s/4p – 1 – 4s/4p – 1 – 4s/4p – 1 – FINISH

Windward-Leeward Slalom courses 
 WS1: START – 1 – 4s/4p – S1 – S2 – S3 – FINISH
 WS2: START – 1 – 4s/4p – 1 – 4s/4p – S1 – S2 – S3 – FINISH
 WS3: START – 1 – 4s/4p – 1 – 4s/4p – 1 – 4s/4p – S1 – S2 – S3 – FINISH

Weather conditions 
In the lead up to the Olympics many questioned the choice of Qingdao as a venue with very little predicted wind. During the races the wind was pretty light and quite unpredictable. Due to lack of wind (< 1.6 knots) two racing days had to be postponed.

Final results

Daily standings

Further reading

References 

Women's RS:X
RS:X
Olym
Women's events at the 2008 Summer Olympics